Phaeochlaena solilucis is a moth of the family Notodontidae. It is found in Brazil, Bolivia, Ecuador and Colombia.

It is a widespread species showing extensive wing-pattern variation.

References

Moths described in 1878
Notodontidae of South America